ADI 4277 and ADPF 132 (May 5, 2011), are landmark Brazil Supreme Court cases.

Rights
After of the decision of the Supreme Court, the same 112 rights of different-sex marriages were given to same-sex stable relationships too, creating a de facto civil union system, including the most important:
Adoption
Inheritance
Pension
Health plan

High Court decision

Judiciary representation

Legislative representation

Executive representation

Amici curiae

See also

 Recognition of same-sex unions in Brazil
 Civil union
 LGBT rights in the Americas
 LGBT rights in Brazil

References

External links
 Allegation of Disobedience of Fundamental Precept (ADPF) 132 - Official text 

Same-sex marriage in Brazil
Same-sex union case law
2011 in LGBT history